The more than 140 cities in the Philippines as of 2022 have taken their names from a variety of languages both indigenous (Austronesian) and foreign (mostly Spanish). The majority of Philippine cities derive their names from the major regional languages where they are spoken including Tagalog (Filipino), Cebuano, Ilocano, Hiligaynon, Bicolano, Kapampangan and Pangasinense. They are written using Spanish orthography in most cases, but a few have also retained their indigenous spellings. The names of thirty-nine cities derive exclusively from the Spanish language while at least three have taken their names from the old Sanskrit language.

Of the 148 cities, sixteen are named in honor of an individual while twelve are named after saints.

City names

See also
 List of Philippine provincial name etymologies

References

Name etymologies
Cities